Motoșeni (formerly Ursa Motoșeni) is a commune in Bacău County, Western Moldavia, Romania. It is composed of fourteen villages: Bâclești, Chetreni, Chicerea, Cociu, Cornățelu, Fântânele, Fundătura, Gura Crăiești, Motoșeni, Poiana, Praja, Rotăria, Șendrești and Țepoaia.

References

Communes in Bacău County
Localities in Western Moldavia